Dolly Parton is an American singer-songwriter, multi-instrumentalist, actress, author, and philanthropist, best known for her work in country music.

Parton is one of the most-honored female country performers of all time. The Recording Industry Association of America has certified 21 of her single and album releases as Gold or Platinum. She has had 25 songs reach number one on the Billboard Hot Country Songs chart, second only to Reba McEntire. She has 42 career top-10 country albums, a record for any artist, and 110 career-charted singles over the past 40 years. All-inclusive sales of singles, albums, collaboration records, compilation usage, and paid digital downloads during Parton's career have reportedly topped 100 million records around the world.

Parton has earned eleven Grammy Awards (including her 2011 Lifetime Achievement Award) and a total of 51 Grammy Award nominations, the second most nominations of any female artist in the history of the prestigious awards, following behind Beyoncé.

At the American Music Awards, she has won four awards out of 18 nominations. At the Country Music Association Awards, she has won 10 awards out of 45 nominations. At the Academy of Country Music, she has won 13 awards and 45 nominations. She is one of only seven female artists (including Reba McEntire, Barbara Mandrell, Shania Twain, Loretta Lynn, Carrie Underwood, and Taylor Swift), to win the Country Music Association's highest honor, Entertainer of the Year (1978). She also has been nominated for two Academy Awards and a Tony Award. She was nominated for an Emmy Award for her appearance in a 1978 Cher television special. She was awarded a star on the Hollywood Walk of Fame for her music in 1984, located at 6712 Hollywood Boulevard in Hollywood, California; a star on the Nashville StarWalk for Grammy winners; and a bronze sculpture on the courthouse lawn in Sevierville. She has called that statue of herself in her hometown "the greatest honor", because it came from the people who knew her. Parton was inducted into the Grand Ole Opry in 1969, and in 1986 was named one of Ms. Magazine's Women of the Year. In 1986, she was inducted into the Nashville Songwriters Hall of Fame.

Awards and nominations

Other honors

Notes

References

Awards
Parton, Dolly